Brownstein is a surname of mixed origin. The name is composed of the English word "brown" and the German word "stein" (meaning "stone"). Notable people with the surname include:

 Alec Brownstein (born 1980), American writer
 Carrie Brownstein (born 1974), American musician and actress
 Irwin Brownstein (1930–1996), New York politician and judge
 Louis Brownstein, better known as Lew Brown (1893–1958), American lyricist

See also
 Braunstein
 Brownstone (surname)
 Bronstein

Jewish surnames
Yiddish-language surnames
Surnames from ornamental names